This is a timeline of Croatian history, comprising important legal and territorial changes and political events in Croatia and its predecessor states.  Featured articles are in bold.  To read about the background to these events, see History of Croatia.  See also the list of rulers of Croatia and years in Croatia.

7th century

8th century

9th century

10th century

11th century

12th century

13th century

14th century

15th century

16th century

17th century

18th century

19th century

20th century

21st century

Map Timeline

See also
 Bans of Croatia
 Croatian art
 Croatian History Museum
 Croatian Military Frontier
 Croatian nobility
 Culture of Croatia
 History of Croatia
 History of Dalmatia
 History of Hungary
 History of Istria
 Hundred Years' Croatian–Ottoman War
 Kingdom of Dalmatia
 Kingdom of Slavonia
 Kings of Croatia
 List of noble families of Croatia
 List of rulers of Croatia
 Military history of Croatia
 Turkish Croatia
 Twelve noble tribes of Croatia

Cities in Croatia
 Timeline of Rijeka
 Timeline of Split
 Timeline of Zagreb

References

Further reading

Notes

External links
 

Years in Croatia